Tivozanib, sold under the brand name Fotivda, is a medication used for the treatment of relapsed or refractory advanced renal cell carcinoma (RCC). It is an oral VEGF receptor tyrosine kinase inhibitor.

The most common side effects include fatigue, hypertension, diarrhea, decreased appetite, nausea, dysphonia, hypothyroidism, cough, and stomatitis.

Tivozanib was approved for medical use in the European Union in August 2017, and in the United States in March 2021.

Medical uses 
Tivozanib is used for the treatment of adults with relapsed or refractory advanced renal cell carcinoma (RCC) following two or more prior systemic therapies.

Contraindications
Tivozanib must not be combined with St. John's Wort, an inducer of the liver enzyme CYP3A4 (see interactions below). It should not be taken during pregnancy as it is teratogenic, embryotoxic and fetotoxic in rats.

Adverse effects
The most common side effects in studies were hypertension (high blood pressure, in 48% of patients), dysphonia (hoarse voice, 27%), fatigue and diarrhoea (both 26%). A hypertensive crisis occurred in 1% of patients.

Interactions
Administration of a single dose of tivozanib with rifampicin, a strong inducer of the enzyme CYP3A4, cuts the biological half-life and total exposure (AUC) of tivozanib in half, but has no relevant influence on highest concentrations in the blood. Combination with ketoconazole, a strong CYP3A4 inhibitor, has no relevant effects. The clinical significance of these findings is not known.

Pharmacology

Mechanism of action
A quinoline urea derivative, tivozanib suppresses angiogenesis by being selectively inhibitory against vascular endothelial growth factor (VEGF). It is designed to inhibit all three VEGF receptors.

Pharmacokinetics
After tivozanib is taken by mouth, highest blood serum levels are reached after 2 to 24 hours. The total AUC is independent of food intake. When in the bloodstream, over 99% of the substance are bound to plasma proteins, predominantly albumin. Although the enzymes CYP3A4 and CYP1A1 and several UGTs are capable of metabolising the drug, over 90% circulate in unchanged form. The metabolites are demethylation, hydroxylation and N-oxidation products and glucuronides.

The biological half-life is 4.5 to 5.1 days; 79% being excreted via the faeces, mostly unchanged, and 12% via the urine, completely unchanged.

Chemistry
Tivozanib is used in form of the hydrochloride monohydrate, which is a white to light brown powder. It is practically insoluble in water and has low solubility in aqueous acids, ethanol and methanol. It is not hygroscopic and not optically active.

History 
It was discovered by Kyowa Kirin and developed by AVEO Pharmaceuticals.

Clinical trials
Phase III results on advanced renal cell carcinoma suggested a 30% or 3 months improvement in median progression-free survival compared to sorafenib but showed an inferior overall survival rate of the experimental arm versus the control arm.  The Food and Drug Administration's Oncologic Drugs Advisory Committee voted in May 2013 13 to 1 against recommending approval of tivozanib for renal cell carcinoma. The committee felt the drug failed to show a favorable risk-benefit ratio and questioned the equipose of the trial design, which allowed control arm patients who used sorafenib to transition to tivozanib following progression disease but not those on the experimental arm using tivozanib to transition to sorafenib.  The application was formally rejected by the FDA in June 2013, saying that approval would require additional clinical studies.

In 2016, AVEO Oncology published data in conjunction with the ASCO meeting showing a geographical location effect on overall survival in the Phase III trial.

In 2016, AVEO Oncology announced the start of a second Phase III clinical study in third line advanced RCC patients.

In 2016, EUSA Pharma and AVEO Oncology announced that tivozanib had been submitted to the European Medicines Agency for review under the centralised procedure.

In June 2017, the EMA Scientific Committee recommended tivozanib for approval in Europe, with approval expected in September.

In August 2017, the European Commission (EC) formally approved tivozanib in Europe.

References

External links 
 

Angiogenesis inhibitors
Cancer treatments
Isoxazoles
Phenol ethers
Quinolines
Receptor tyrosine kinase inhibitors
Ureas